Rehungen is a former municipality in the district of Nordhausen, in Thuringia, Germany. Since 1 January 2009, it is part of Sollstedt.

Former municipalities in Thuringia